Kampalapura Veeranna Narayana (born 20 October 1948), also known as KVN, is an Indian linguist, professor of Kannada language and literature, and a literary critic. He is currently the Chairman of the Kuvempu Bhasha Bharathi Pradikara, Government of Karnataka. He hails from Piriyapattana in Mysore district. During his time as a professor in Bangalore University, he initiated investigations into Kannada language and culture from the root level. He served as the registrar of Hampi Kannada University. His major areas of interest are Kannada language, literature, teaching and science.

He received the Karnataka Sahitya Akademi Honorary Award for a lifetime's contribution to Kannada language and literature. He initiated a series of workshops on Kannada, what he calls Karnataka Odu, a special knowledge zone on Kannada. He is considered as one of the major thinkers of our times.

Early life and education
KVN received his primary education in his birthplace, Kampalapura. He pursued his pre-university education in  Science at the National College, Bengaluru. Though he had an opportunity to study engineering he decided against it; instead he pursued a Bachelor of Science in Yuvaraja college, Mysore. Subsequently, he completed his B.Ed and became a teacher in a high school. He was introduced to linguistics at a summer school in Mysore during 1972. Later, he moved to Bengaluru to further his education. It is during this he began to make his mark as a writer. He chose literature for his further studies. He then received his M.A. (Kannada Literature) from Central College, Bangalore University. This is where he met Shrimathi, his future wife, who was a well-known feminist. He began teaching at Bangalore's National college. He joined the Kannada Adhyana Kendra, which was headed by GS Shivarudrappa (GSS), under whose guidance he studied "Anandavardana's Dwanyaloka" and acquired his Ph.D.

Career 
KVN taught literature, literary criticism, and linguistics. Scientific temperament formed the basis of his growth as a literary critic, linguist and cultural thinker of Kannada. He was a visiting professor at Stony Brook University in 1984. He was a senior fellow for two years at the Central Institute of Indian Languages, Mysore. In 1993, he joined Hampi Kannada University as a Kannada professor. Later, he went on to become the registrar of this university. He also took up the roles of the Dean and acting Vice-Chancellor many times. During his tenure, he played a prominent role in building the Kannada Vishwavidyala through his diligent administration and studies. After 15 years of service, he retired from the university in 2007.

He is currently the president of the Kuvempu Bhasha Bharathi Pradikara, Government of Karnataka.

Books 
 Beru, Kanda, Chiguru (1997)
 Bhasheya Sutthamuttha 
 Matthe Bhasheya Sutthamuttha (1998)
 Anke Tappida Artharo Uyi
 Kannada Jagattu Ardhashatamaana
 Nammodane Namma Nudi
 Sahitya Tatva - Bendre Dristi
 Kannadada Ulikantegalu: Kannada Adunudiya Sollarime - 1
 Stalanamagalu - Parivatane Mattu Prabhava
 ShailiShastra - Sahitya Paribhashika Male
 Bhaashe (Kannada Vishvakosha)
 Dhvanyalokada Oodu
 Tondumevu (in 9 volumes)
 Dhvanyaloka: Ondu Adhyayana (1988)
 Vyaktinamagalu: Swarupa Mattu Visleshane (2000)

Co-authored:
 Krushipada Kosha
 Gowrava (2001)
 Kavyartha Padakosha 
 Preethisuvudendare
 Kannada Manasu - Engineering Prathama Padavi

Plays 
 Huttava Badidare

Awards 
 Karnataka Sahitya Akademi Award (Honorary) (2007)
 GSS Award for Literary Criticism (2007)
 Karnataka Rajyotsava Award(Literature) (2010)
 L Basavaraju Award (2003)

See also

 Kannada
 Kannada literature

References

External links
 
 
 
 
 
 

1948 births
Living people
Kannada-language writers
People from Mysore district
Kannada people
Kannada language
Bangalore University alumni
University of Mysore alumni
Scientists from Karnataka
Recipients of the Rajyotsava Award 2010